Keith Dexter Skelton (May 6, 1918 – October 23, 1994) was an American attorney, soldier and politician. He served in the Oregon Legislative Assembly and as a World War II B-17 pilot. As a pilot, he flew over fifty missions in the war against Japan. He received his BS from Edinboro University, his MS from University of Michigan and his JD from the University of Washington. He served seven terms in the Oregon House of Representatives, from 1957 to 1973, first from Lane County, then from Multnomah County. He was also an attorney, was on the faculty of two state universities, and served on the Board of Directors of Portland Community College from 1987 onward.  He had been chair of Governor Tom McCall's Task Force on Transportation.

Skelton was born on a farm near Cambridge Springs, Pennsylvania.

He had two daughters, Carol and Anne, and two sons, Keith and Thomas. In 1968 he married fellow legislator and future Oregon Supreme Court judge Betty Roberts.

Skelton died on October 23, 1994.

Writings
 "Legislative Interim Committees Created by Resolution," Oregon Law Review, XXXVIII (February 1959), pp. 97–121

References

1918 births
1995 deaths
People from Crawford County, Pennsylvania
Democratic Party members of the Oregon House of Representatives
University of Oregon faculty
Portland State University faculty
University of Washington School of Law alumni
University of Michigan alumni
Edinboro University of Pennsylvania alumni
Lawyers from Portland, Oregon
20th-century American lawyers
Roberts family of Oregon
20th-century American politicians